Double Take is a 1998 thriller film directed by Mark L. Lester. It follows a writer who believes he helped wrongly convict a man in an assassination, pulling him into a world of espionage and murder.

Cast
 Craig Sheffer as Connor McEwan
 Costas Mandylor as Hector
 Brigitte Bako as Nikki Capelli
 Dan Lett as Detective Hardaway
 Torri Higginson as Peggy
 Maurice Godin as Fritz
 Peter Keleghan as Robert Mead
 Frank Pellegrino as Frankie

Reception
Chris Parry of eFilmCritic.com wrote: "If you catch this late at night on TV, you may be tempted to watch til the end just to see how awful it can get. Do yourself a favor, fight that urge."

References

External links
 
 

1998 films
English-language Canadian films
1998 thriller films
Films directed by Mark L. Lester
Canadian thriller films
American thriller films
1990s English-language films
1990s American films
1990s Canadian films